Charles Hulme,  (born 12 October 1953) is a British psychologist. He holds the Chair of Psychology and Education in the Department of Education at the University of Oxford, and is a William Golding Senior Research Fellow at Brasenose College, Oxford.  He is a Senior Editor of Psychological Science, the flagship journal of the Association for Psychological Science.

A graduate of Oriel College, Oxford, where he was awarded a DPhil in 1979 under the supervision of Peter Bryant and Donald Broadbent, he spent the rest of his early career at the University of York where he was professor from 1992–2011. From 2011 to 2016 he was professor of psychology at University College London.

Personal life
In 1995 he married fellow academic Margaret Snowling.

Honours
In 2016, Hulme was elected a Fellow of the Academy of Social Sciences (FAcSS). In July 2017, he was elected a Fellow of the British Academy (FBA), the United Kingdom's national academy for the humanities and social sciences.

He was awarded the British Psychological Society's Spearman Medal in 1985.

Publications

Hulme, Charles, and Margaret J. Snowling. Developmental Disorders of Language Learning and Cognition. Chichester, U.K.: Wiley-Blackwell, 2009.
Snowling, Margaret J., and Charles Hulme, co-eds. The Science of Reading: A Handbook. Malden, MA: Blackwell Pub, 2005. 
 Also published in Spanish, 
Hulme, Charles, and R. Malatesha Joshi,co-editors Reading and Spelling: Development and Disorders. Mahwah, N.J.: L. Erlbaum Associates, 1998.
Cowan, Nelson, and Charles Hulme., eds.  The Development of Memory in Childhood. Hove, East Sussex, UK: Psychology Press, 1997.
Hulme, Charles, and Margaret J. Snowling, eds.  Dyslexia: Biology, Cognition, and Intervention. San Diego, Calif: Singular Pub. Group, 1997.
Hulme, Charles, and Susie Mackenzie. Working Memory and Severe Learning Difficulties. Hove, East Sussex, U.K.: L. Erlbaum Associates, 1992. 
 Also published in Spanish, as Dificultades graves en el aprendizaje : el papel de la memoria de trabajo
Hulme, Charles. Reading Retardation and Multi-Sensory Teaching. London: Routledge & Kegan Paul, 1981.

References

External links 
 academic homepage

1953 births
Living people
Alumni of Oriel College, Oxford
Academics of University College London
Academics of the University of York
British psychologists
Fellows of the British Academy
Fellows of Brasenose College, Oxford
Fellows of the Academy of Social Sciences